"The Price of Tomatoes" was an American television movie broadcast by NBC on January 16, 1962, as part of the television series, The Dick Powell Show. It was written and produced by Richard Alan Simmons and directed by David Friedkin. Peter Falk starred and won the Emmy Award for outstanding single performance by an actor in a leading role.

Plot
A Greek truck driver, Aristede Fresco (played by Peter Falk), seeks to deliver a shipment of tomatoes from El Paso, Texas to Cincinnati, Ohio before his competitor arrives. He is sidetracked when he picks up a pregnant Romanian illegal immigrant, Anna Beza (played by Inger Stevens). She goes into labor and he takes her to the office of a doctor who turns out to be an astrological doctor. He then seeks out a real hospital. After helping her through the birth of her child, Fresco returns to the road and passes his competition.

Cast
The cast included performances by:

 Peter Falk as Aristede Fresco
 Inger Stevens as Anna Beza
 William Challee as Dr. Clement Connell
 Milt Kogan as Jerry Sindell
 Merritt Bohn as Mr. Michaels
 Alejandro Rey as Perez
 Hank Weaver as Casey
 Robert Hoy as Officer
 Robert Kelljan as Dr. Rubell
 Nancy Millard as Nurse

Production
The production was broadcast by NBC on January 16, 1962, as part of the television series, The Dick Powell Show. It was written and produced by Richard Alan Simmons and directed by David Friedkin. Carl Guthrie was the director of photography, and J. M. Van Tamelen was the art director.

Reception
Peter Falk won the Emmy Award for outstanding single performance by an actor in a leading role. The production also received Emmy nominations for Inger Stevens for outstanding single performance by an actress in a leading role and for Richard Alan Simmons for outstanding writing achievement in drama.

References

1962 television films
1962 films
American television films
Films about illegal immigration